Abou Sofiane Balegh (born 22 March 1987) is an Algerian footballer who plays for MC El Bayadh in the Algerian Ligue Professionnelle 1.

References

External links

1988 births
Living people
Footballers from Oran
Algerian footballers
Association football forwards
Association football utility players
MC Alger players
MC Oran players
ASM Oran players
USM Annaba players
CR Belouizdad players
USM Bel Abbès players
CS Constantine players
RC Relizane players
Algerian Ligue Professionnelle 1 players
Algerian Ligue 2 players
21st-century Algerian people